Abhipur Muillahpur is a  village in Nawabganj tehsil in Bareilly district, Uttar Pradesh, India.

References

Villages in Bareilly district